Lau Wong-fat, GBM, GBS, OBE, JP (15 October 1936 – 23 July 2017) was a Hong Kong businessman and politician. He had been the long-time chairman of the Rural Council, the most powerful organ representing the interests of the New Territories indigenous inhabitants from 1980 to 2015. He was also a member of the Legislative Council of Hong Kong from 1985 to 2016. From 2009 to 2012 he was a non-official member of the Executive Council of Hong Kong. He had also served as the member of the Chinese People's Political Consultative Conference and chairman of the Regional Council and the Tuen Mun District Council.

He began to involve in New Territories rural politics as a village representative in the Tuen Mun Rural Committee and climbed to the head of the villagers as the chairman of Heung Yee Kuk in 1980, where he kept the position for 35 years until he passed it on to his son, Kenneth Lau. He was appointed member of the Hong Kong Basic Law Drafting Committee and played an instrumental role in ensuring rural interests in the drafting of the Basic Law of Hong Kong. He was first indirectly elected to the Legislative Council through the Regional Council functional constituency in 1986 and he held his seat through Heung Yee Kuk constituency from 1991 to 2004 and from 2008 until 2016 when he was replaced by his son. From 2004 to 2008 he was indirectly elected through the District Council constituency. He was also the chairman of the Tuen Mun District Council from 1985 to 2011 and the chairman of the Regional Council from 1995 to 1999.

In 2009, he was appointed by Chief Executive Donald Tsang to the Executive Council, the highest advisory council of the Hong Kong government where he served until 2012. For this, together with his extensive ownership of land and property, he was known as the "King of the New Territories" or the "Land Emperor of the New Territories". He died in 2017 at the age of 80.

Early life and rural politics
Lau was born in the village of Lung Kwu Tan, Tuen Mun, New Territories in 1936. At the age of 22, Lau was selected by local villagers at the Lung Kwu Tan Village to be a representative of Tuen Mun, the youngest ever village leader. He became chairman of the Tuen Mun Rural Committee in 1970 under the tutelage of chairman of the Heung Yee Kuk Chan Yat-sen, a position he held for 41 years, until in April 2011 the committee amended its constitution to limit any chairman to no more than two four-year terms. However, he was re-elected as chairman of the rural committee in 2015.

His longstanding membership of the rural committee was as village representative for Lung Kwu Tan. For many years unopposed, in January 2011, he faced the village's approximately 600 voters, after a challenge following the controversy of his failure to disclose some of his property holdings. He and his ally won comfortably, with even the defeated young candidates claiming "I just want to learn things from Fat Shuk [Uncle Fat]."

As the rural committee chairman, Lau was automatically an ex-officio member of Tuen Mun District Council, and became its chairman in 1985. He briefly lost this position in April 2011 with his ousting from leadership of the rural committee by another pro-Beijing politician Junius Ho. After failing to win a seat in the 2011 District Council elections, and against protests by rural committee members and local villagers, he was directly appointed back to the council by Chief Executive Donald Tsang, and on 4 January 2012 was elected by District Councillors back into the post of council chairman. He held the chairmanship of the Tuen Mun District Council again from 2015 to 2016 until he retired from the rural committee.

Heung Yee Kuk chairman
In 1980 Lau became the chairman of the Heung Yee Kuk, which represented established interests of all inhabitants in the New Territories. He held the position for 35 years and was elected for nine terms. By the powerful nature of the Kuk he became a high flyer in the Hong Kong politics. In May 2015, he stepped down as chairman and was succeeded by his son, Kenneth Lau.

The Melhado Investment Ltd in which Lau was a major shareholder sued the government in the early 1980s for its non-agricultural use of land in the New Territories. In 1983, the Court of Appeal ruled in favour of the Melhado. The Melhado case thus became the beginning of widespread use of land in the New Territories for the open storage of containers.

In the capacity of the Kuk chairman, Lau was invited to be a guest at the signing of the Sino-British Joint Declaration on 19 December 1984 in Beijing. In 1985, he was appointed to the Hong Kong Basic Law Drafting Committee by the Beijing government, which was responsible for drafting the mini-constitution of Hong Kong in 1997, where he played an instrumental role in the insertion of the Article 40 in the Basic Law to ensure indigenous interests remained protected after Hong Kong’s handover to Chinese sovereignty in 1997. He was a member of the Chinese People's Political Consultative Conference from 1993 to 2003. He was also appointed Hong Kong Affairs Advisors and Preparatory Committee for the Hong Kong Special Administrative Region by Beijing ahead of the handover of Hong Kong.

In 1986 Lau also became a member of the Regional Council where he became the chairman of the Council from 1995 to 1997 and the chairman of the Provisional Regional Council from 1997 to 1999 until the Regional Council and the Urban Council were abolished in 2000.

Legislative Councillor
Lau first became a member of the Legislative Council of Hong Kong in 1985 after the creation of the newly created functional constituency Regional Council where he was elected by the members of the Council. He did not stand for the 1988 re-election but was appointed by Governor David Wilson instead. In 1991, a Rural functional constituency was created where members of the Heung Yee Kuk elected its own Legislative Council representative. Lau was uncontestedly elected six times with a brief interruption from 2004 and 2008 where he stood in the District Council functional constituency as the incumbent pro-Beijing legislator Ip Kwok-him of the Democratic Alliance for the Betterment of Hong Kong (DAB) lost his District Council seat and therefore ineligible to run.

He was the founding member of the Co-operative Resources Centre, a conservative political group led by Senior Unofficial Member Allen Lee in 1991 to counter the liberal emergence of the United Democrats of Hong Kong in the Legislative Council after the 1991 direct election. The group later transformed itself into the Liberal Party where Lau was a member until he quit the party in 2008. In the 2008 Legislative Council election, Liberal Party chairwoman Selina Chow accused Lau for campaigning for DAB candidate Cheung Hok-ming, the Kuk vice-chairman, who ran in the same constituency which caused her defeat. As a result, Lau quit the party with Andrew Leung, Jeffrey Lam and Sophia Leung, which made the number of the Liberal Party's seats drop from seven to three. The split members later formed the Economic Synergy in 2009 which later merged with the Professional Forum into the Business and Professionals Alliance for Hong Kong (BPA) where Lau was the honorary chairman.

In January 2009, Lau was appointed to the Executive Council of Hong Kong by Chief Executive Donald Tsang, where he held the position until 2012.

Lau's performance in Legco was considered one of the worst as he had not initiated a motion since 1998. His only motion was on 4 December 2013 against the incorporation of Tai Long Sai Wan into Country Park but was defeated. In 2009 and 2010, Lau supported the disputed HK$66.9 billion funding of Express Rail, and advocated the controversial reform of methods for selecting the CE and LegCo. In 2014, Lau was awarded top position in the no-show charts in his participation of the Legislative Council. His attendance rate at work had stirred up concern that he was actually deceased given his age. From 2004 to 2016, he was the oldest member in the Legislative Council.

He was at the centre of the declaration-of-interest scandal in 2010. However, Legco ultimately refrained from investigating Lau, for reasons that were never made public. This had caused some people believe that there was collusion between Lau and the government for mutual gain.

He was also at the centre of the controversy in the pro-Beijing walkout ahead of the voting on the Methods for Selecting the Chief Executive in 2017 and for Forming the LegCo in 2016 as the pro-Beijing legislators launched walkout was an impromptu attempt to delay the division so that Lau, who was delayed, could cast his vote in favour of the Beijing-backed reforms. The strategy backfired and the government's reform proposal failed as eight legislators voted in favour and 28 voted against, barely meeting the quorum of 35.

Controversies

Property disclosure incident
In October 2010, Lau was publicly criticised for his purchase of 19 properties in Yuen Long through companies linked to him after he failed to disclose at least some of the acquisitions to the council within the required 14 days. In a span of 10 days he revised his declared total ownership of land three times, bringing further criticism from leading figures such as Legco House Committee chairwoman Miriam Lau and deputy chairwoman of Legco's Committee on Members' Interests Emily Lau. His portfolio was later revealed to contain a large amount of land in Hong Kong with 724 plots of land and he was described as "a huge landlord" by Miriam Lau.

Together with his family and through various companies, he owns 40 commercial and residential properties including houses and flats. Prior to October 2010 he registered only 337 plots of land. He failed to declare the purchases of three houses in Yuen Long in April and 16 flats in Yoho Midtown through Carofaith Investment, in which he holds 40% stake. Another company controlled by his son Kenneth Lau and Lau's daughter-in-law also bought eight flats in Yoho. His son sold three of them making a profit of HK$800,000 at a time when the government was trying to cool real estate property prices in 2010.

Litigation
In June 2012, the Hong Kong press reported that an indigenous inhabitant of the indigenous village known as San Tin Village in Yuen Long of the New Territories of Hong Kong by the name of Man Yuk Moon had commenced civil proceedings (HCA 1012 / 2012) against Mr Lau Wong Fat at the High Court of Hong Kong, claiming HK$5,870,000. According to the local press, Mr. Lau Wong Fat refused to comment on the issue when asked. He merely stated that the litigation had been passed to his lawyers for their further handling. The current status of this lawsuit is unclear.

Retirement and personal life
Amid deteriorating health condition, Lau did not seek re-election as the chairman of the Heung Yee Kuk in May 2015, and was succeeded by his son Kenneth Lau. In January 2016, he was absent from the election of the chairman of the Tuen Mun District Council. The council elected DAB's Leung Kin-man as the new chairman. On 22 February 2016, he resigned as the chairman of the Tuen Mun Rural Committee and thus lost the ex-officio membership of the district council and was succeeded by his son Kenneth Lau. He had already been absent from the Legislative Council occasionally before he gave up standing in the 2016 re-election. His seat in the Heung Yee Kuk functional constituency was succeeded by his son Kenneth Lau.

Lau's self-declared educational record was that he attended Ling Shan College but the identity of this institution is not clear. His business holdings are centred on his chairmanship of Wing Tung Yick (Holdings) Ltd.

He was married to Ng Mui-chu, and had five children including Kenneth Lau. His sister married Kingsley Sit, also a rural leader and former member of the Legislative Council. He died on 23 July 2017 at the age of 80 after a long illness.

Other positions, awards and recognition
In 1977, a new school was named after him: Lau Wong Fat Secondary School in Kowloon. In 1983, he succeeded Tang Yuek Fan as chairman of the New Territories Heung Yee Kuk Yuen Long District Secondary School. He was also an honorary court member of the Hong Kong University of Science and Technology. He also received an honorary doctoral degree from the China University of Political Science and Law in 2012.

Wong Chu Road, a major thoroughfare in Tuen Mun New Town linking Tuen Mun Road and the western part of the town, was named after him and his wife, Lau Ng Mui-chu. Castle Peak Estate, the first public housing estate in Tuen Mun, was renamed San Fat Estate after him and Chan Yat-sen, another prominent figure in the Kuk.

From 2004 to 2015 he had represented Hong Kong to perform the Lunar New year kau cim ceremony, succeeding Patrick Ho in the role.

He was made Justice of the Peace in 1973. In 1981, he was awarded Member of the Order of the British Empire (MBE) and the Officer of the Order of the British Empire (OBE) in 1989. In 1998, he was awarded Gold Bauhinia Star (GBS) and in 2005 he received the Grand Bauhinia Medal, Hong Kong's highest honour.

See also
 Small House Policy
 Waiting for Uncle Fat

References

External links
 List of positions held by Lau Wong-fat, Webb-site

1936 births
2017 deaths
Hong Kong businesspeople
Hong Kong people of Hakka descent
People from Huiyang
Recipients of the Gold Bauhinia Star
Recipients of the Grand Bauhinia Medal
Members of the Order of the British Empire
Officers of the Order of the British Empire
District councillors of Tuen Mun District
Indigenous inhabitants of the New Territories in Hong Kong
Members of the Regional Council of Hong Kong
Heung Yee Kuk
Liberal Party (Hong Kong) politicians
Economic Synergy politicians
Business and Professionals Alliance for Hong Kong politicians
Members of the Executive Council of Hong Kong
Members of the National Committee of the Chinese People's Political Consultative Conference
Members of the Provisional Legislative Council
Hong Kong Buddhists
HK LegCo Members 1985–1988
HK LegCo Members 1988–1991
HK LegCo Members 1991–1995
HK LegCo Members 1995–1997
HK LegCo Members 1998–2000
HK LegCo Members 2000–2004
HK LegCo Members 2004–2008
HK LegCo Members 2008–2012
HK LegCo Members 2012–2016
Members of the Preparatory Committee for the Hong Kong Special Administrative Region
Members of the Selection Committee of Hong Kong
Hong Kong Basic Law Drafting Committee members
Hong Kong Affairs Advisors
Hong Kong politicians of Hakka descent
Hong Kong racehorse owners and breeders